Polyhymno charigramma is a moth of the family Gelechiidae. It was described by Edward Meyrick in 1929. It is found in Amazonas, Brazil.

The wingspan is about 12 mm. The forewings are fuscous with the dorsal edge and middle of the costal edge finely whitish. The white lines on each side of the fold from the base to the tornus, the upper somewhat irregular. There is a white dash in the disc beyond the middle, and three shorter superposed dashes beyond this and there is a fine angulated violet-metallic line from the costa at four-fifths to the tornus, near and parallel to the margins, preceded and followed by grey-yellowish suffusion. The hindwings are grey.

References

Moths described in 1929
Polyhymno